Sara Mustonen (born 8 February 1981) is a Swedish racing cyclist, who most recently rode for UCI Women's Continental Team . Prior to becoming a cyclist she was a boxer. She took up cycle racing after working as a bicycle courier. She competed in the women's road race at the 2008 Summer Olympics and the 2013 UCI women's road race in Florence. Her father is Finnish.

Major results

2006
 5th Time trial, National Road Championships
2008
 6th Tour de Berne
 10th GP Liberazione
2009
 National Road Championships
4th Road race
5th Time trial
 4th Overall Tour de Bretagne Féminin
 4th Omloop van Borsele
 5th Holland Hills Classic
 6th Open de Suède Vårgårda
 7th Rund um die Nürnberger Altstadt
 9th Ronde van Gelderland
2010
 National Road Championships
3rd Road race
3rd Time trial
 6th Dwars door de Westhoek
 8th Overall Tour Féminin en Limousin
 8th GP Stad Roeselare
 9th Overall Women's Tour of New Zealand
 9th Overall La Route de France
 9th Grand Prix Elsy Jacobs
2011
 National Road Championships
3rd Time trial
4th Road race
 3rd Cholet Pays de Loire Dames
 5th Overall Tour of Chongming Island
 5th Omloop van Borsele
2012
 10th Overall Belgium Tour
2013
 5th Tour of Chongming Island World Cup
 10th Overall Tour of Chongming Island
2014
 National Road Championships
3rd Road race
5th Time trial
 4th 7-Dorpenomloop Aalburg
 6th Cholet Pays de Loire Dames
2015
 National Road Championships
2nd Road race
2nd Time trial
 3rd Omloop van het Hageland
 3rd Trofee Maarten Wynants
2016
 2nd Road race, National Road Championships
 5th Diamond Tour
 7th Overall Ladies Tour of Norway
2017
 9th Erondegemse Pijl
2018
 3rd Overall Tour of Uppsala
 3rd Tour of Guangxi
 10th Grand Prix International d'Isbergues
2019
 1st  Overall Tour of Uppsala
1st  Points classification
1st Stage 1
 9th Vuelta a la Comunitat Valenciana Feminas

See also
 2014 Team Giant-Shimano season

References

External links

 

1981 births
Living people
Swedish female cyclists
Olympic cyclists of Sweden
Cyclists at the 2008 Summer Olympics
Cyclists at the 2016 Summer Olympics
Swedish people of Finnish descent
Sportspeople from Skåne County
20th-century Swedish women
21st-century Swedish women